Gluvian is a hamlet in mid Cornwall, England, United Kingdom.

Mayor William Mayow of Gluvian in the parish of St Columb was hanged outside a tavern in St Columb in 1549.

References

Hamlets in Cornwall
St Columb Major